Noel is the first holiday studio album from contemporary Christian music recording artist Josh Wilson, which was produced by Matt Bronleewe and released on October 9, 2012, by Sparrow Records. The album was met with commercial and critical successes.

Background and release
The album was released on October 9, 2012 by Sparrow Records, and it was produced by Matt Bronleewe. This album was the first Christmas album by Josh Wilson.

Music and lyrics
At Worship Leader, they stated that the "Beautiful acoustic guitar and a haunting and hollow piano tone are the first musical touches you hear on Noel", and on that "Noel is basically its permanent home, in quality and uniformity of sound." Sarah Fine of New Release Tuesday wrote that this was a "very simplistic Christmas project with very few bells and whistles", and noted that "it does serve as the perfect album for intimate moments of praise by the fire this holiday season." At Indie Vision Music, Jonathan Andre compared the musical style here to the likes of Andrew Peterson and Steven Curtis Chapman.

Critical reception

Noel garnered generally positive reception by music critics. At Worship Leader, they rated it four stars, and wrote that the artist was "warm and welcoming", which they compared the album to "a sonic mug of mulled cider." Sarah Fine of New Release Tuesday rated it the same, and she declared that it came in as expected, which was "simple, airy and chock-full of cozy, holiday warmth." At Indie Vision Music, Jonathan Andre rated the album three stars, and commented that "From reflective melodies and heartfelt hopeful inspirations, Josh is able to utilise his musical ability to carve out songs that will hopefully remind, transform and encourage listeners to see beyond themselves this December holiday." Emily Kjonaas of Christian Music Zine rated it three stars, and said it was simply "a good record."

Track listing

Personnel 

 Josh Wilson – vocals, arrangements, acoustic piano, organ, synthesizer pads, acoustic guitar, electric guitar, baritone guitar, bouzouki, mandola, mandolin, ukulele, autoharp, bass, drums, percussion, mallets, hammered dulcimer
 Matt Bronleewe – programming, various random additional and supplemental sonic material, guitars
 Nathan Johnson – electric guitars
 Tony Lucido – bass
 Jeremy Lutito – drums
 Paul Mabury – drums
 Joe Henderson – percussion
 Paulo Clayton – hammered dulcimer
 Sam Levine – saxophones, woodwinds
 Chris Carmichael – strings, string arrangements
 Will Pickering – arrangements
 Wes Pickering – arrangements, backing vocals
 Josh Rosenthal – arrangements, backing vocals
 Becca Wilson – backing vocals
 Mandisa – vocals (3)
 Andrew Peterson – vocals (10)

Choir

 Vinnie Alibrandi – choir
 Christopher Anderson – choir
 Danny Berrios – choir
 Katherine Bessimer – choir
 Shawn Blackney – choir
 Carmen Brown – choir
 Bonnie Carnes – choir
 Bryan Chisholm – choir
 Chad Chrisman – choir
 Jesi Christiansen – choir
 Kara-Lyn Clary – choir
 Susan Collier – choir
 Bethany Debayle – choir
 Stewart Dolca – choir
 Matt Ewald – choir
 Clint Fields – choir
 Lee Fox – choir
 Jeff Gunkel – choir
 Charlie Hadcock – choir
 Brittani Hale – choir
 Karrie Hardwick – choir
 Andrew Hirth – choir
 David Johnson – choir
 Carl Kates – choir
 Megan Keisling – choir
 Jessica Kelm – choir
 Rebecca Lindley – choir
 Joe Littlefield – choir
 Kelee Littrell – choir
 Liz George – choir
 Kyle Marion – choir
 Kathy Maynard – choir
 Jamie Neeck – choir
 Laura Newby – choir
 Brad O'Donnell – choir
 Ondie Ponton – choir
 Abbey Radeka – choir
 Kelly Redfern – choir
 Kristina Rehberg – choir
 Ryan Russell – choir
 Amy Saffell – choir
 Sharon Shaub – choir
 Jordan Smith – choir
 Jackie Stammen – choir
 William White – choir
 Betsy Williams – choir
 Jimi Williams – choir
 Becca Wilson – choir

Production

 Matt Bronleewe – producer
 Josh Wilson – producer (1, 7-10), editing
 Jeff Pardo – vocal producer
 Brad O'Donnell – A&R
 Vinnie Alibrandi – engineer
 Andy Hunt – engineer, editing
 Stephen Leiweke – engineer
 Ainslie Grosser – mixing
 Sean Moffitt – mixing
 Andrew Mendelson – mastering at Georgetown Masters, Nashville, Tennessee
 Jess Chambers – A&R administration
 Lani Crump – production coordinator
 Dave Steunebrink – production coordinator
 Jan Cook – art direction
 Sarah Sung – package design
 Cameron Powell – photography

Charts

References

2012 Christmas albums
Josh Wilson (musician) albums
Albums produced by Matt Bronleewe
Christmas albums by American artists
Sparrow Records albums